Perversi is an Italian surname originally from Lombardy region. Notable people with the surname include:

 Angel Perversi (born 1944), Businessman.
Luigi Perversi (1906–1991), Italian footballer
Luigina Perversi (1914–1983), Italian gymnast

Italian-language surnames